{{DISPLAYTITLE:C20H25NO2}}
The molecular formula C20H25NO2 may refer to:

 Adiphenine
 Dienogest
 Estrazinol, or 3-methoxy-8-aza-19-norpregna-1,3,5(10)-trien-20-yn-17-ol
 Femoxetine
 Ketorfanol, or ketorphanol

Molecular formulas